Taplin is a family name. People with the surname Taplin include:

Bralon Taplin (born 1992), Grenadian sprinter
 Cheryl Taplin (born 1972), American track and field athlete
 Rev. George Taplin (1831–1879), Australian Congregationalist minister and anthropologist
 John Ferguson Taplin (1914–2008), American businessman, repeated donor to Harvard Medical School
 Jonathan Taplin (born 1947), American writer, film producer and scholar
 Kim Taplin (born 1943), English poet and non-fiction writer
 Leonard Taplin (1895–1961), South Australian pilot during World War I who moved to Port Hedland, Western Australia
 Louise Taplin (1855–1901), English-born Australian nurse
 Mary-Ellen B. Taplin, research oncologist at Dana Farber Cancer Institute and Brigham and Women's Hospital
 Millicent Taplin (1902–1980), British ceramicist
 Oliver Taplin FBA (born 1943), British academic and classicist
 Walter Taplin (1910–1986), editor of The Spectator between 1953 and 1954
 Rabbi Yisroel Taplin, American Talmud scholar and author